This is a list of episodes from the sixth season of Impractical Jokers.

Episodes

References

External links 
 Official website
 

Impractical Jokers
2017 American television seasons